Waterproof may refer to 

 Waterproofing, the process of making an object waterproof or resistant to water
 Waterproof (film), a 2000 Christian drama film
 Waterproof, Louisiana, a village in northeastern Louisiana, United States
 Waterproof (comedian), Ghanaian comedian and actor